(English: 'One Life, Three Stories') combines a live concert album with two DVDs of Regional Mexican artist Jenni Rivera on December 2, 2014. This collection represents three major components of the singer's life: her work on-stage, her family, and her friends. The last disc, is a DVD of the tribute concert held one year after her death, featuring performances by her family and many close friends in the Latin music world. The DVD includes performances by some of Rivera's children, father, siblings and some of her very close friends such as Larry Hernandez, La Original Banda el Limon, Chuy Lizarraga, Diana Reyes, Tito el Bambino and others.

Track listing

Charts

Release history

See also
 List of number-one Billboard Latin Albums from the 2010s

References

2014 live albums
Jenni Rivera live albums
Fonovisa Records live albums
Spanish-language live albums
Jenni Rivera video albums
Fonovisa Records video albums